Juju or ju-ju is a spiritual belief system incorporating objects, such as amulets, and spells used in religious practice in West Africa by the people of Nigeria, Benin, Togo, Ghana, Congo and Cameroon. The term has been applied to traditional African religions. 

In a general sense, the term "juju" can be used to refer to magical properties dealing with good luck.

History

The term "juju" appeared in connection with the Priest-Kings of towns in West Africa, upon whom the prosperity of towns was believed to depend. This is recorded by Sir James George Frazer in Folk-Lore (Vol. XXVI), under the title, "A Priest-King in Nigeria", a communication received from Mr. P. A. Talbot, District Commissioner in S. Nigeria. The writer states that the dominant Ju-Ju of Elele, a town in the N.W. of the Degema district, is a Priest-King, elected for a term of seven years. "The whole prosperity of the town, especially the fruitfulness of farm, byre, and marriage-bed, was linked with his life. Should he
fall sick, therefore, it entailed famine and grave disaster upon the inhabitants ..."

Practices
Juju is a folk magic in West Africa; within juju, a variety of concepts exist. Juju charms and spells can be used to inflict either bad or good juju. According to some authors, "It is neither good nor bad, but it may be used for constructive purposes as well as for nefarious deeds." Juju charms can at times employ Arabic texts written by Islamic religious leaders. A "juju man" is any man vetted by local traditions and well versed in traditional spiritual medicines.

Juju is sometimes used to enforce a contract or ensure compliance. In a typical scenario, the witch doctor casting the spell requires payment for this service.

The word Juju is used in the African Diaspora to describe all forms of charms made in African Diaspora Religions and African Traditional Religions.

References

Traditional African religions
Amulets
Incantation
African witchcraft
Magic (supernatural)

pt:Macumba